Hidden Gold is a 1932 American Western film directed by Arthur Rosson and written by James Mulhauser and Jack Natteford. The film stars Tom Mix, Judith Barrie, Raymond Hatton, Eddie Gribbon, Donald Kirke and Wallis Clark. The film was released on November 3, 1932, by Universal Pictures.

Plot
Doc Griffin (Donald Kirke) and his two henchmen rob a bank and quickly hide the loot before they are apprehended. The handsome owner of the horse ranch Nora Lane (Judith Barrie) loses all her money because of this. The police have Lane's employee Tom Marley (Tom Mix) infiltrate the prison with the robbers, hoping the thieves will tell Marley where the loot is hidden. When the trio manages to escape from prison, Marley has to hide his cover longer. His undercover action works too well, however, and both Lane and the police think he has actually joined the criminals. Marley then steals horses from Lane's ranch, and she is kidnapped by Griffin who takes her to the woods to find the loot. When he accidentally starts a forest fire, Griffin shoots his henchmen to keep the money for himself. Lane, meanwhile, escapes and runs off with Marley's horse Tony Jr. Marley herself fights through the burning forest, knocks Griffin down and takes the money to a safe place. He frees 'Spike' Weber (Raymond Hatton) after the other robber 'Big Ben' Cooper (Eddie Gribbon) dies. The story ends well: Marley proposes to Lane and returns the loot to the bank.

Cast 
 Tom Mix as Tom Marley
 Judith Barrie as Nora Lane
 Raymond Hatton as Spike Webber
 Eddie Gribbon as Big Ben Cooper
 Donald Kirke as Doc Griffin
 Wallis Clark as Jones
 Roy Moore as The Warden
 Tony Jr. the Horse as Tony

References

External links 
 
 
 
 

1932 films
American Western (genre) films
1932 Western (genre) films
Universal Pictures films
Films directed by Arthur Rosson
American black-and-white films
1930s English-language films
1930s American films